The Assistant Majority and Minority Leaders of the Senate of Puerto Rico (commonly called Majority Whip and Minority Whip) are two Puerto Rican Senators who are elected by the party conferences that hold the majority and the minority respectively. These leaders substitute the Majority and Minority leaders in their absence.

Current assistant leaders
The Senate is currently composed of 12 senators from the Popular Democratic Party (PPD), 10 senators from the New Progressive Party (PNP), 2 senators from the Movimiento Victoria Ciudadana (MVC), and one senator each from the Puerto Rican Independence Party (PIP) and Proyecto Dignidad (PD) as well as one independent senator.

The incumbent whips are senators at-large Gretchen Marie Hau Irizarry (from the PPD), Carmelo Ríos Santiago (from the PNP), and Rafael Bernabe Riefkohl (from the MVC).

List of party whips
The "Majority" column indicates which party was the majority in the Senate, while the opposing column indicates the minority. The PIP is usually a minority with just one senator, which also precludes it from having an assistant leader.

See also

 Party leaders of the Senate of Puerto Rico

References

Officers of the Senate of Puerto Rico